The Lightning Rider is a 1924 American silent Western film directed by Lloyd Ingraham and featuring Harry Carey. Prints of The Lightning Rider are held in the collections of the Museum of Modern Art in New York City and Cinémathèque Française in Paris.

Plot 
The bandit Ramon Gonzales, operating as "the Black Mask," begins terrorizing the town of Caliboro, California, near the Mexico–United States border. After the local parish priest entrusts Sheriff Alvarez with church money, the Black Mask steals it, kills Alvarez, and frames Deputy Sherrif Philip Morgan. Morgan tries to catch the real villain with a plan that involves disguising himself as the Black Mask, but he is discovered and nearly lynched. Morgan is saved when Gonzalez's girlfriend Claire Grayson betrays him, and once freed Morgan successfully proposes to Alvarez's daughter Patricia.

Cast
 Harry Carey as Phlip Morgan
 Virginia Brown Faire as Patricia Alvarez
 Thomas G. Lingham as Sheriff Alvarez
 Frances Ross as Claire Grayson
 Léon Bary as Rammon Gonzales (as Leon Barry)
 Bert Hadley as Manuel
 Madame Sul-Te-Wan as Mammy

Production 
The Lightning Rider, originally titled Desert Rose, was completed as the third film in Carey's contract for six Western films produced by Hunt Stromberg. It was shot primarily at the Charles Ray Studio in Los Angeles. Stromberg sought to make the film as a psychological thriller rather than an action film as Western films were predominantly made.

See also
 Harry Carey filmography

References

External links
 
 
 

1924 films
1924 Western (genre) films
American black-and-white films
Films directed by Lloyd Ingraham
Films distributed by W. W. Hodkinson Corporation
Silent American Western (genre) films
Films set in California
Films shot in Los Angeles
1920s American films